"The Apartment Is Beautiful" is the seventh episode of the fifth season of the South Korean anthology series Drama Stage. Directed by Jo Eun-sol and produced by Studio Dragon and Fantagio, it stars Park Hyo-joo and Seo Young-hee. This drama is story of the protagonist who won the lease confronts 'unbeautiful neighbors' in the 'beautiful apartment' in her own way. The episode will be aired on tvN on July 1, 2022, at 12:10 (KST).

Cast

Main
 Park Hyo-joo as Seo Hee-jae 
 In late 30s, artist, The Shenu, Building 201, Room 1401
 Seo Young-hee as Moon Se-yeon 
 In late 30s, Sociology Professor, The Shenu, Building 201, Room 1604
 Hwang Sun-hwa as Choi Eun-joo
In late 30s, N Job, The Shenu 101, Room 505
 Kim Gyu-na as Ha Seung-yoon
 8 years old, Hee-jae's daughter
 Kim Ji-yu as Kim Ah-jeong
 8 years old, Se-yeon's daughter
 Koh Dong-ha as Park Joon-hee
8 years old, Eun-ju's son 
 Kwon Hyuk as Ha Young-seok
In early 30s, Heejae's husband, documentary director
 Yoon Byung-hee as Gil Joo-nam
 In mid 40s, Small and Medium Business Manager

Others
 Kim Dae-ryeong as Kim Wang-cheol 
In 40s, Se-yeon's husband
 Ryu Ye-ri as Eun Jeong-hyeon 
In 30s, Hee-jae's classmate
 Kim Ji-hwan as Oh Jae-hyeong 
8 years old
 Lee Cho-ah as Mo Jae-hyeong  
 In 30s
 Kim Shin-yong as Principal
 In 50s
 Joo-hyun as Gallery CEO 
 40 big

Production
The one-act play is produced by Fantagio with lead cast of Park Hyo-joo, Seo Young-hee, Hwang Seon-hwa, Kwon Hyuk, and Yoon Byung-hee.

Original soundtrack

Ratings

References

External links
 

2022 South Korean television episodes
Drama Stage